Vale of Leven Rovers Football Club was a Scottish association football club based in the town of Alexandria, Dunbartonshire.

History

The club was founded in 1873.  Owing to a club in Glasgow having an identical name, the media sometimes referred to the club as Rovers (Alexandria).

The club's first recorded matches took place in October 1875. and it first entered the Scottish Cup that season, the only one in which both the Alexandria and Glasgow Vale of Leven Rovers clubs both entered.  However neither played a tie; the Glaswegian club scratching to Dumbreck F.C., and the Alexandria club scratching to Vale of Leven F.C., which was the strongest club in Dunbartonshire.

The club's only matches in the competition came in 1876–77.  The club drew twice against Renton Thistle in the first round, and, under the rules of the competition at the time, both clubs went through to the second round.  Rovers then were drawn against Vale of Leven again; this time Rovers attended the tie, but lost 7–0, despite some "capital passing play".

The club's final Scottish Cup entry was in 1877–78, but, faced with inevitable defeat in the first round against Renton, it withdrew.

Although the club was said to have disbanded in 1877, there are sporadic records of a Vale of Leven Rovers club from the area playing from 1887 to 1892, albeit against second eleven sides or junior sides, so the name may have been revived for the Vale of Leven reserves.

Colours

The club's home colours were light blue shirts with white shorts and black stockings.

References 

Defunct football clubs in Scotland
Association football clubs established in 1873
1873 establishments in Scotland
Association football clubs disestablished in 1877
1877 disestablishments in Scotland
Vale of Leven